Captain Raja Muhammad Sarwar Bhatti (10 November 1910 – 27 July 1948) , best known as Muhammad Sarwar, was an officer in the Pakistan Army who was cited with the first Nishan-i-Haider for his gallantry and actions of valor during the first war between India and Pakistan in 1947–48.

Biography

Raja Muhammad Sarwar Bhatti was born in a small village, Singhori, that was located in the vicinity of the Gujar Khan Tehsil, Rawalpindi District, Punjab, British India in British Indian Empire on 10 November 1910, according to his tombstone. He was a military brat whose father, Raja Muhammad Hayat Khan Bhatti, was an enlist in the British Indian Army, retiring at rank of Havildar. His family hailed from a Muslim-caste of the Punjabi Rajput tribe.

He was educated in government-run schools in Rawalpindi District and secured his matriculation from a local school in Faisalabad in 1928. After graduation, he followed his father, Havildar Muhammad Hyatt, path and enlisted in the British Indian Army in 1929 as a Sepoy, where he was posted with the 2nd Battalion of the 10th Baloch Regiment (2/10th Baloch Regiment) of the Baloch Regiment (present 7th Battalion The Baloch Regiment (Steadfast Battalion)). From 1929 until 1939, he worked hard towards reacting the one of the highest enlisted ranks and was eventually promoted as the Naib Subedar and posted in supply and ammunition with the Pakistan Army Service Corps in 1939.

In 1939, Sarwar was invited to attend the Indian Military Academy in Dehradun and completed his military training before gaining commission in the 2nd Battalion of the 1st Punjab Regiment (2/1st Punjab Regiment) of the British Indian Army in 1943. In 1944, 2nd-Lt. Sarwar briefly served in the Burma, serving with distinction in the military operations in 1944–45 that earned him the Burma Star by the British administrations in Delhi in India.

In 1944, 2nd-Lt. Sarwar was posted in an administrative position in the Punjab Regiment — he was promoted as Lieutenant in 1945–46. In the British Indian Army personnel accounts, Lt. Sarwar was known to be "a serious man with no nonsense and deeply religious who would practice his religion, Islam, devotedly and offered five prayers everyday, first offering the prayer before sunrise and concluding with the very last midnight prayer."

In 1946–47, Lt. Sarwar was promoted as army captain and decided to attend the signal course before Capt. Sarwar was recommissioned in the Pakistan Army Corps of Signals in 1947, and directed towards attending the Military College of Signals. After hearing the news of the first war between India and Pakistan over Jammu and Kashmir, Capt. Sarwar immediately wanted volunteered but refrained due to his officers wanted him to complete his schooling on the military signals, which he completed after a year. In 1948, Capt. Sarwar took over the command of the 2nd Battalion of the Punjab Regiment of the Pakistan Army as its commanding officer and was deployed on frontline.

A march towards the Uri town of the Jammu and Kashmir was commenced under Capt. Sarwar, and led an attack on the organized Indian Army's troops, forcing them to retreat from the Gilgit-Baltistan to Ladakh on 26 July 1948. Capt. Sarwar's company followed the retreated Indian Army's troops to the Uri region where his unit faced off the strongly fortified enemy position located in the Uri sector. His company was only 50 yards away from the fortified enemy position as the Indian Army's soldiers begin their mortar shelling at his positions, and received instructions on leading the attack on the left side of the bunker where the shelling was taking place. Moving towards the new position, his passage was blocked due to the barbed wires and decided to move to cut the wires with only taking six men alongside. During the firefight, Capt. Sarwar used the bolt cutter to cut their barbed wires and due to the downpour of shelling,  taking a bullet with a machine gun fire.

On 27 July 1948, Capt. Sarwar was killed while clearing the passage– he was 38 years old at the time of his death.

Family background and personal life

Muhammad Sarwar's father, Raja Muhammad Hayat Khan, had served in the British Indian Army and was decorated with the British war medal for his services in the World War I– Muhammad Hayat retired as a Havildar Sergeant and died on 23 November 1932. Muhammad Sarwar had three brothers and one sister. Raja Muhammad Sarwar married in arranged marriage in 1936 and had a son and a daughter from that marriage.

Nishan-e-Haider 
The body of Capt. Sarwar is buried at the Hill of Tilpatra which is near the Uri in Indian Kashmir where he was buried on 27 July 1948. It was on 23 March 1956 when the Government of Pakistan recognized his services as the Parliament of Pakistan authorized to posthumously award the Nishan-E-Haider (Eng. lit. Emblem of the Lion) for his meritorious services, which was awarded to him by the President of Pakistan. The Presidential Nishan-e-Haider citation on his grave is written in Urdu; and it reads with translation as:

Citation 
Battle of Tilpatra in Uri: When Quaid-e-Azam Muhammad Ali Jinnah declared Jihad in Kashmir and ordered Pakistan Army to participate in it. Captain Sarwar were participating in a course in GHQ's School of Signals. His unit 2 Punjab Regiment entered Kashmir to face the enemy. As soon as the course ended he persisted to take permission to participate in Jihad of Kashmir, with his unit which was granted. He was appointed as the signals officer. He offered  to fight the enemy at Tilpatra hill. On 27 July 1948, he took his men with him and attacked the enemy. The enemy opened fire with machine guns, artillery and mortars. He kept on advancing. His machine gunner got killed. He took hold of his gun and attacked. When a second gunner arrived he handed over the machine gun to him. He, along with some soldiers, advanced from another side and destroyed a machine gun of the enemy and  advanced There was barbed wire, which he cut himself and let the soldiers pass through it and led the  assault on the enemy. During this time, a burst from the automatic machine gun of the enemy injured him. His actions in the battle of Tipatra led him to be  posthumously presented with the Nishan-e-Haider.

In 1967, the federal government later established the marble tomb in his memory to offer remembrance of his career highlights in the military and martyrdom to the civil society with additional funding was later secured by Imtiaz Warraich, the MP on the platform of the Pakistan Muslim League (N) to expand the facility in his memory in 1990— the marble tomb is located near his locality.

In memory

In 1968, a paintings exhibition was inaugurated in Lahore, Pakistan depicting Pakistani war heroes including the first sketched portrait of Capt. Muhammad Sarwar.

In 1991, he was subjected a biographical war telefilm, "Captain Muhammad Sarwar Shaheed" produced and directed by the Qasim Jilali of the PTV. In addition, the federal government established the community college, the Sarwar Shaheed College, in his honor near his birthplace in the Gujar Khan.

Galleries

Awards and decorations

Foreign decorations

See also 
 Gujar Khan
 Sawar Muhammad Hussain Shaheed

References

External links

S
S
S
S
S
S
S
S
S
S
S
S
S
S
S